Kostino-Otdelets is a rural locality (a selo) and the administrative center of Kostino-Otdelskoye Rural Settlement, Ternovsky District, Voronezh Oblast, Russia. The population was 1,372 as of 2010. There are 16 streets.

Geography 
Kostino-Otdelets is located 24 km southwest of Ternovka (the district's administrative centre) by road. Zarechye is the nearest rural locality.

References 

Rural localities in Ternovsky District